Pasley is an unincorporated community in Duplin County, North Carolina, United States.

Notes

Unincorporated communities in Duplin County, North Carolina
Unincorporated communities in North Carolina